Victoria Creek is a stream in the U.S. state of South Dakota. It is located in the Black Hills, near Rapid City, which is north-northeast of the Mount Rushmore National Memorial.

Some say the creek took the name of a local mining company, while others believe the creek has the name of Queen Victoria.

See also
List of rivers of South Dakota

References

Rivers of Pennington County, South Dakota
Rivers of South Dakota